Oisseau is a commune in the Mayenne department in north-western France.

See also
Communes of Mayenne

References

External links

 Oisseau website

Communes of Mayenne